Pioneer Telephone Cooperative may refer to:

 Pioneer Telephone Cooperative (Oklahoma)
 Pioneer Telephone Cooperative (Oregon)